The Almont is a river in the Ile-de-France region of northern France.

Its source is located between the towns of Nangis and Rampillon.

References

Rivers of France
Rivers of Île-de-France
Rivers of Seine-et-Marne